Semimi, or Etna Bay, is a Papuan language spoken in Kaimana Regency, West Papua, Indonesia.

Bibliography
Word lists
Earl, George Windsor. 1853. The Native Races of the Indian Archipelago: The Papuans. London: Hippolyte Bailliere.
Miklucho-Maclay, Nikolaj N. 1951. Spisok nekotoryx slov dialektov Papuasov berega Papua-Koviaj na Novoj Gvinee [Some words in the dialects of the Papuans of the Papua-Kowiai Coast in New Guinea]. In: Anfert’ev (ed.), 208–211.
Miklucho-Maclay, Nikolai von. 1876. Verzeichniss einiger Worte der Papuas der Küste Papua-Kowiay in Neu-Guinea. Tijdschrift voor Indische Taal-, Land- en Volkenkunde (TBG) 23: 372–379.
Gabelentz, Georg von der and Adolf Bernard Meyer (eds.). 1882 Beiträge zur Kenntnis der melanesischen, mikronesischen und papuanischen sprachen. Leipzig: S. Hirzel.
Voorhoeve, Clemens L. 1975. Languages of Irian Jaya, Checklist: Preliminary Classification, Language Maps, Wordlists. Canberra: Pacific Linguistics.

References

Languages of western New Guinea
Mairasi languages